The Otto Laporte Award (1972–2003) was an annual award by the American Physical Society (APS) to "recognize outstanding contributions to fluid dynamics" and to honour Otto Laporte (1902–1971). It was established as the Otto Laporte Memorial Lectureship by the APS Division of Fluid Dynamics in 1972, and became an APS award in 1985. The Otto Laporte Award was merged into the Fluid Dynamics Prize in 2004, in order to obtain one major prize in fluid dynamics by the APS.

Recipients 
	
 2003:         Norman J. Zabusky
 2002: 	Andrea Prosperetti
 2001: 	John Kim
 2000: 	Hassan Aref
 1999: 	Eli Reshotko
 1998: 	David G. Crighton
 1997: 	Marvin Emanuel Goldstein
 1996: 	Donald Coles
 1995: 	Katepalli R. Sreenivasan
 1994: 	Philip G. Saffman
 1993: 	Robert Kraichnan
 1992: 	William C. Reynolds
 1991: 	Steven A. Orszag
 1990: 	Tony Maxworthy
 1989: 	Chia-Shun Yih
 1988: 	Akiva Yaglom
 1987: 	John Trevor Stuart
 1986: 	Milton Van Dyke
 1985: 	Hans W. Liepmann
 1984: 	Sir James Lighthill
 1983: 	John W. Miles
 1982: 	Peter Wegener
 1981: 	H. W. Emmons
 1980: 	R. Byron Bird
 1979: 	Stanley Corrsin
 1978: 	Cecil E. Leith, Jr.
 1977: 	Y. C. Fung
 1976: 	George F. Carrier
 1975: 	Russell J. Donnelly
 1974: 	J. M. Burgers
 1973: 	Chia C. Lin
 1972: 	Richard G. Fowler

See also

 List of physics awards

External links 

 Otto Laporte Award, American Physical Society

Awards of the American Physical Society
Fluid dynamics
Awards established in 1972